During the 1950–51 English football season, Everton F.C. competed in the Football League First Division.

Final League Table

P = Matches played; W = Matches won; D = Matches drawn; L = Matches lost; F = Goals for; A = Goals against; GA = Goal average; GD = Goal difference; Pts = Points

Results

Football League First Division

FA Cup

Squad

References

Everton F.C. seasons
Everton F.C. season